Josef Kovařík (born April 27, 1966) was a Czechoslovakian nordic combined skier who competed from 1991 to 1993. He finished sixth in the 3 × 10 km team event at the 1992 Winter Olympics in Albertville.

Kovařík's only career victories were in two 15 km individual events in 1991 and 1993.

External links

Nordic combined skiers at the 1992 Winter Olympics
Czech male Nordic combined skiers
Living people
1966 births
Place of birth missing (living people)